SHETRAN is a hydrological modelling system for water flow, solute and sediment transport in river catchments. SHETRAN is a physically based, distributed model (PBDM) that can simulate the entire land phase of the hydrologic cycle including surface water flow and groundwater flow. The plan area of the catchment in SHETRAN is usually in the range of one to a few thousand square kilometres and the horizontal depth of the subsurface is usually less than 100m.

In the 1980s the Système Hydrologique Européen (SHE) model was developed by a consortium of three European organizations:  the Institute of Hydrology (the United Kingdom), SOGREAH (France) and DHI (Denmark).  Its successors are MIKE SHE (DHI) and SHETRAN (School of Civil Engineering and Geosciences, Newcastle University).

The SHE model was renamed SHETRAN at School of Civil Engineering and Geosciences, Newcastle University, after the introduction of the sediment and solute transport component. Since then it has undergone further improvements. The biggest change was the introduction of a fully 3-dimensional subsurface or variably saturated subsurface (VSS) component. Recent changes have focused on making the model more user friendly with the introduction of a Graphical user interface. This includes the automatic generation of river channels from a Digital elevation model so that a catchment simulation can be set up rapidly.

See also
Hydrological transport model

References 
Abbott, M.B., Bathurst, J.C., Cunge, J.A., O'Connell. P.E. and Rasmussen J. (1986).  An introduction to the European hydrological system - Systeme Hydrologique Europeen, "SHE", 1: History and philosophy of a physically-based, distributed modelling system.  Journal of Hydrology, 87, 45-49.
Ewen, J., Parkin, G. and O'Connell, P.E. (2000).  SHETRAN: Distributed River Basin Flow and Transport Modelling System. Journal Hydrologic Eng., 5, 250-258.
Birkinshaw, S.J., James, P. and Ewen, J. (2010). Graphical User Interface for Rapid Set-up of SHETRAN Physically-Based River Catchment Model. Environmental Modelling & Software, 25, 609–610.
Lewis, E., Birkinshaw, S., Kilsby, C., and Fowler, H. J. (2018). Development of a system for automated setup of a physically-based, spatially-distributed hydrological model for catchments in Great Britain. Environmental modelling & software, 108, 102-110.

External links 
 Shetran web site

Integrated hydrologic modelling
Hydrology models
Newcastle University